XHKF-FM is a radio station on 90.5 FM in Iguala, Guerrero. It is owned by Grupo Radio Centro and carries its La Z grupera format.

History
XEKF-AM 1360 received its concession on October 16, 1947. It was owned by Rafael Campos Marquina until 1977, when it was sold to Radio XEKF, S.A.

In 2004, XEKF was sold to Grupo Radio Capital. Capital, in turn, sold the station in 2008 to Grupo Radio México.

XEKF was cleared for AM-FM migration in 2010 as XHKF-FM 90.5. Official promotions, however, do not mention the FM station.

References

Radio stations in Guerrero
Radio stations established in 1947
Grupo Radio Centro